Evan Carlson (born June 28, 1953) is a Canadian politician, who represented the electoral district of Melville in the Legislative Assembly of Saskatchewan from 1991 to 1995.

Background
Born and raised in Melville, Carlson worked as a farmer before entering politics, and served on the board of the Melville Credit Union.

Politics
He was first elected in the 1991 provincial election, defeating incumbent Progressive Conservative MLA Grant Schmidt. However, he was defeated in the 1995 provincial election by Ron Osika of the Liberals.

He subsequently stood as the federal New Democratic Party candidate in Yorkton—Melville in the 1997 federal election, but lost to Reform Party incumbent Garry Breitkreuz.

Career after politics
He was subsequently employed as a victim support worker with the Saskatoon Police Service from 1999 to 2003, and is currently a mental health worker with the Saskatoon Health Region. He is also on the board of an emergency housing shelter in Saskatoon.

Electoral record

|-

|style="width: 130px"|NDP
|Evan Carlson
|align="right"|3,656
|align="right"|45.90%
|align="right"|+7.31

|style="width: 130px"|Prog. Conservative
|Grant Schmidt
|align="right"|3,048
|align="right"|38.26%
|align="right"|-15.20

|style="width: 130px"|Liberal
|Ray Chastkavich
|align="right"|1,262
|align="right"|15.84%
|align="right"|+8.33
|- bgcolor="white"
!align="left" colspan=3|Total
!align="right"|7,966
!align="right"|100.00%
!align="right"|

|-

|style="width: 130px"|NDP
|Evan Carlson
|align="right"|2,975
|align="right"|38.07%
|align="right"|-7.83

|style="width: 130px"|Prog. Conservative
|Doug Gattinger
|align="right"|1,566
|align="right"|20.04%
|align="right"|-18.22
|- bgcolor="white"
!align="left" colspan=3|Total
!align="right"|7,815
!align="right"|100.00%
!align="right"|

References

Saskatchewan New Democratic Party MLAs
Living people
New Democratic Party candidates for the Canadian House of Commons
Saskatchewan candidates for Member of Parliament
Canadian people of Norwegian descent
1953 births